Dherbs, Inc. is an American privately owned herbal distribution company headquartered in Los Angeles, California. It was founded in 2004 by A.D. Dolphin, who is also the company's CEO. Dherbs is best known for its use of "Vegicaps", an herbal supplement tablet that does not use gelatin.

Products
The company's products include organic and herbal supplements for health cleanses. The Dherbs Full Body Cleanse was recognized by Shape as one of the "Top 10 Detox Diets of 2014". In December 2015, Dherbs announced a documentary web series titled The 180.

Dherbs was featured on The Steve Harvey Morning Show and The D.L. Hughley Show and has been endorsed by Brandy, Shemar Moore and Elise Neal. In 2016, on The Steve Harvey Show, the company donated ten thousand dollars to a couple who started a camp for adolescent males.

References

External links
Official Website
The Golden Monk
Naturopath Herbals

Herbalism organizations
Companies based in California
Companies established in 2004